Cannes Film Festival Technical Grand Prize1975 A Touch of ZenFantafestivalBest Direction1983 The Wheel of Life
| module             = 
}}

Hu Jinquan (29 April 1932 – 14 January 1997), better known as King Hu, was a Chinese film director and actor based in Hong Kong and Taiwan. He is best known for directing various wuxia films in the 1960s and 1970s, which brought Hong Kong and Taiwanese cinema to new technical and artistic heights. His films Come Drink with Me (1966), Dragon Inn (1967), and A Touch of Zen (1970–1971) inaugurated a new generation of wuxia films in the late 1960s. Apart from being a film director, Hu was also a screenwriter and set designer.

Early life
Hu was born in Beijing to a well-established family originating from Handan, Hebei. His grandfather was the governor of Henan in the late Qing dynasty. His father had studied in Japan and was the owner of the local coal mine. His uncle was a high-ranking official in the Republican government. Several of his brothers held high positions in the Communist government. Hu grew up in Beijing as a child. He emigrated to Hong Kong in 1949, at first he wanted to study in the United States, but could not raise the money for tuition. He then worked for the local Voice of America in Hong Kong.

Career
After moving to Hong Kong, Hu worked in a variety of occupations, such as advertising consultant, artistic designer and producer for a number of media companies, as well as a part-time English tutor. In 1958, he joined the Shaw Brothers Studio as a set decorator, actor, scriptwriter and assistant director. He acted in the classic 1959 film The Kingdom and the Beauty. Under the influence of Taiwanese director Li Han-Hsiang, Hu embarked on a directorial career, helping him on the phenomenally successful The Love Eterne (1963). Hu's first film as a full-fledged director was Sons of the Good Earth (1965), a film set in the Second Sino-Japanese War, but he is better remembered for his next film, Come Drink with Me (1966). Come Drink with Me was his first success and remains a classic of the wuxia genre, catapulting the then 20-year-old starlet Cheng Pei-pei to fame. Blending Japanese samurai film traditions with Western editing techniques and Chinese aesthetic philosophy borrowed from Chinese music and operatics, Hu began the trend of a new school of wuxia films and his perpetual use of strong, valiant heroines.

Leaving the Shaw Brothers Studio in 1966, Hu travelled to Taiwan, where he made another wuxia movie, Dragon Inn. Dragon Inn broke box office records and became a phenomenal hit and cult classic, especially in Southeast Asia. This tense tale of highly skilled martial artists hidden in an inn was said to be the inspiration for Ang Lee's Crouching Tiger, Hidden Dragon (2000) and Zhang Yimou's House of Flying Daggers (2004). In 2003, the award-winning Malaysian-born Taiwanese auteur Tsai Ming-liang made Goodbye, Dragon Inn, a tribute to Hu, in which all the action takes place during a closing cinema's last show of Dragon Inn.

Chief among the films which exemplify Hu's blend of Chan (Zen) Buddhism and unique Chinese aesthetics is A Touch of Zen, which won the Grand Prix de la Commission Superieur Technique in 1975 Cannes Film Festival, and which many regard as his masterpiece. After releasing A Touch of Zen, Hu started his own production company and shot The Fate of Lee Khan (1973) and The Valiant Ones (1975) back to back on tight finances. The action choreography in both these films was the work of a young Sammo Hung. Other films include Raining in the Mountain and Legend of the Mountain (both dating from 1979, and shot in South Korea), which were loosely based on stories from Pu Songling's Strange Stories from a Chinese Studio. The reason was that the government of South Korea would help sponsor the budgeting should he produce at least two films in the area. Both are now considered classics.

Though critically hailed, Hu's later films were less commercially successful than his first two films. After his late comedy masterpiece All the King's Men, he moved to California in the early 1980s. Late in his life, he made a brief return from semi-retirement in The Swordsman (1990) and Painted Skin (1992), but neither achieved the renown of his first two, financially successful wuxia films. Hu spent the last decade of his life in Los Angeles. He died in Taipei of complications from angioplasty. He is buried in Whittier, California.

Filmography
Sons of the Good Earth (大地兒女, 1965)
Come Drink with Me (大醉俠, 1966)
Dragon Inn (龍門客棧, 1967)
Four Moods (喜怒哀樂, 1970, segment: "Anger")
A Touch of Zen (俠女, 1971)
The Fate of Lee Khan (迎春閣之風波, 1973) 
The Valiant Ones (忠烈圖, 1975)
Raining in the Mountain (空山靈雨, 1979)
Legend of the Mountain (山中傳奇, 1979)
Zhong Shen Da Shi (The Juvenizer) (終身大事, 1981)
Tian Guan Ci Fu (Heaven's Blessing) (天官赐福, 1981)
The Wheel of Life (Part 1 short film segment) (大輪迴, 1983)All the King's Men (天下第一, 1983)
The Swordsman (笑傲江湖 in part, 1990)
Painted Skin (畫皮之陰陽法王, 1992)

Personal life 
Hu loves Peking Opera and was a trustee of a Peking Opera institution. He promoted many young Peking Opera pupils into the film industry, such as Jackie Chan and Sammo Hung.

References

External links
 
 King Hu at Hong Kong Cinemagic
 Senses of Cinema - King Hu

1932 births
1997 deaths
20th-century Chinese male actors
Chinese male film actors
Film directors from Beijing
Hong Kong film directors
Male actors from Beijing
Taiwanese film directors
Taiwanese people from Beijing